The AVN Award for Male Foreign Performer of the Year is an award that has been given annually by sex industry company AVN since the award's inception in 2003.

First recipient of the award was Italian-born pornographic actor Rocco Siffredi who was awarded at 20th AVN Awards in 2003. As of 2023, eight pornographic actors have been awarded who are of five different nationalities: Italian (ten), British (four), French (three), German and Spanish (two).

Italian pornographic actor Rocco Siffredi is the most honoured actor with ten awards followed by British pornographic actor Danny D with three awards and German pornographic actor Steve Holmes with two awards. Rocco Siffredi is the oldest recipient of the award at the age of 56 in 2021 and Danny D is the youngest recipient of the award at the age of 29 in 2017. Most recent winner of the award is British pornographic actor Danny D, who was awarded at 40th AVN Awards in 2023.

Overview

Winners and nominees

2000s

2010s

2020s

Superlatives

Multiple winners and nominees

Multiple winners

Multiple nominees

See also
 AVN Award for Male Performer of the Year
 AVN Award for Best Actor
 AVN Award for Best Supporting Actor

References

External links
 

Awards established in 2003
Male Foreign Performer of the Year
Awards for male actors